Lewis Henry Redner (December 15, 1831, Philadelphia, Pennsylvania – August 29, 1908, Hotel Marlborough, Atlantic City, New Jersey) was an American musician, best known as the composer of the popular Christmas carol "St. Louis", better known as "O Little Town of Bethlehem".

Redner worked in the real-estate business in Philadelphia, and played the organ at four different churches during his life. He spent 19 years as organist at the Church of the Holy Trinity, Philadelphia. While there, he set Pastor Phillips Brooks's poem of his recollection of a pilgrimage to Bethlehem to music on Christmas Eve, 1868, and the carol was first sung the next day.

Redner was very involved with local charities.  He served on the first board of Sunday Breakfast Rescue Mission, a homeless shelter and soup kitchen, in 1878.

Redner never married. He was buried at The Woodlands Cemetery in Philadelphia.

References

External links

 
 
 
 
 

1831 births
1908 deaths
American male composers
American composers
American organists
American male organists
Songwriters from Pennsylvania
Musicians from Philadelphia
Burials at The Woodlands Cemetery
19th-century American male musicians
American male songwriters
19th-century organists